Sir James Bruce Robertson  (born 15 February 1944), generally known as Bruce Robertson, is a retired judge of the Court of Appeal of New Zealand, where he was appointed in May 2005.

Early life and family
Born in Dunedin on 15 February 1944, Robertson was educated at Wakari School and Otago Boys' High School. He is a graduate of the University of Otago and the University of Virginia. He holds an honorary LLD from the University of Otago.

In 1969, Robertson married Lindsay Joyce Radford, and the couple went on to have three children.

Legal career
Before becoming a High Court judge in 1987, Robertson was a partner in the law firm Ross, Dowling, Marquet and Griffin. One of his earliest appointments after his appointment to the High Court was to chair the Search and Search Warrants Committee, which published its final report in 1988. From 2001 until his appointment as a member of the Court of Appeal, he was President of the New Zealand Law Commission. Robertson was also a judge on the Court of Appeal of Vanuatu.

Robertson is also the consulting editor for Adams on Criminal Law and Adams on Criminal Law Student Edition.

In 2013, Robertson was appointed as chairperson of the Sports Tribunal of New Zealand.

Robertson was appointed as the New Zealand Commissioner of Security Warrants in July 2013.

Honours
In the 2010 New Year Honours, Robertson was appointed a Knight Companion of the New Zealand Order of Merit for services as a judge of the High Court and the Court of Appeal.

References

1944 births
Living people
University of Otago alumni
University of Virginia alumni
High Court of New Zealand judges
Court of Appeal of New Zealand judges
Knights Companion of the New Zealand Order of Merit
New Zealand judges on the courts of Vanuatu
Lawyers from Dunedin
People educated at Otago Boys' High School